Thomas C. Baker is an American entomologist, focusing in study of insect pheromones and odor-mediated behavior, neuroethological studies of olfaction, identification and development of insect attractants for IPM systems, and development of olfaction-based biosensors and chemical ecology, currently Distinguished Professor at Pennsylvania State University and an Elected Fellow of the American Association for the Advancement of Science.

References

Year of birth missing (living people)
Living people
Fellows of the American Association for the Advancement of Science
Pennsylvania State University faculty
American entomologists
Cornell University alumni
Michigan State University alumni